Chartella is a genus of bryozoans belonging to the family Flustridae.

The genus has almost cosmopolitan distribution.

Species:

Chartella elongata 
Chartella notialis 
Chartella papyracea 
Chartella papyrea 
Chartella tenella

References

Bryozoan genera